Meizhou Hakka Football Club (Hakka language: Mòi-Chû Hag-Ga chuk-khiù khî-lo̍k-phu) is a professional Chinese football club that currently participates in the Chinese Super League under license from the Chinese Football Association (CFA). The team is based in Wuhua County, Meizhou in the province of Guangdong and their home stadium is the 27,000 capacity Huitang Stadium. Their current majority shareholders are the Meizhou municipal government, Municipal Sports Bureau, Wei Real Estate Development Co. Ltd. and partners. The club was renamed Meizhou Wuhua Football Club according to Meizhou Daily. However, the original name was still used in official documents of CFA all the time.

History
Meizhou Hakka F.C. was established in January 2013 by former Guangdong Sunray Cave manager Cao Yang along with the support of the Meizhou municipal government, Municipal Sports Bureau. He would soon go on to gain financial support from the Chairman of Wei Real Estate Development Co., Ltd., Wei Jinping who was persuaded in investing into the team after Cao Yang described his envision of creating a footballing hub in Wuhua County, the home town of former Chinese footballer and coach Lee Wai Tong. The squad was assembled with local Hakka players and players from other teams in Guangdong, including Guangdong Sunray Cave, Guangzhou Evergrande, Shenzhen Ruby and Shenzhen Fengpeng before entering the third tier in the 2013 league season where despite topping the group stages they finished fifth in the knock-out stages.

Former Chinese national team Head coach Qi Wusheng was brought in during the 2015 China League Two season. He would go on to help guide the club to win the division title in a penalty shoot-out against Dalian Transcendence and promotion to the second tier for the first time in the clubs history. Qi Wusheng would not extend his contract with the club and Dutch football manager Luc Nijholt was brought in on 1 January 2016 as well as 80 million Yuan to invest within the team. Luc Nijholt would leave the team on 19 July 2016 as the club sat twelfth within the league and marginally above the relegation zone, a position they would remain in for the rest of the season. After several managerial changes with limited success, Serbian Manager Milan Ristić was brought in on 6 February 2021 and he was able to guide the team to promotion to the top tier at the end of the 2021 China League One season.

Name history
According to the club's statement:
2013 Meizhou Kejia 梅州客家
2014– Meizhou Wuhua 梅州五华
According to official documents of CFA:
2013–2015 Meizhou Kejia 梅州客家
2016— Meizhou Hakka 梅州客家

Current squad

First team squad

Reserve squad

Out on loan

Coaching staff

Managerial history

 Cao Yang (2013)
 Tan Ende (2014–26 May 2015)
 Zhang Jun (26 May 2015 – 3 July 2015)
 Qi Wusheng (3 July 2015–31 Dec 2015)
 Luc Nijholt (1 Jan 2016–19 Jul 2016)
 Cao Yang (caretaker) (19 Jul 2016–31 Dec 2016)
 Vjekoslav Lokica (16 Feb 2017–29 Apr 2017)
 Cao Yang (caretaker) (29 Apr 2017–23 Jul 2017)
 Aleksandar Stankov (23 Jul 2017–18 Dec 2017)
 Rusmir Cviko (18 Dec 2017–28 Aug 2018)
 Li Weijun (carettaker) (28 Aug 2018–19 Dec 2018)
 Zheng Xiaotian (19 Dec 2018–6 Nov 2019)
 Marcelo Rospide (12 Nov 2019–31 Dec 2020)
 Milan Ristić (2 Feb 2021–present)

Honours
 China League Two (Third Tier League) 
Winners (1): 2015

Results
All-time league rankings

As of the end of 2019 season.

 In group stage.

Key
<div>

 Pld = Played
 W = Games won
 D = Games drawn
 L = Games lost
 F = Goals for
 A = Goals against
 Pts = Points
 Pos = Final position

 DNQ = Did not qualify
 DNE = Did not enter
 NH = Not Held
 – = Does Not Exist
 R1 = Round 1
 R2 = Round 2
 R3 = Round 3
 R4 = Round 4

 F = Final
 SF = Semi-finals
 QF = Quarter-finals
 R16 = Round of 16
 Group = Group stage
 GS2 = Second Group stage
 QR1 = First Qualifying Round
 QR2 = Second Qualifying Round
 QR3 = Third Qualifying Round

References

 
Football clubs in China
Sport in Meizhou
Association football clubs established in 2013
2013 establishments in China